The women's 400 metres event at the 1979 Summer Universiade was held at the Estadio Olimpico Universitario in Mexico City on 8, 9 and 10 September 1979.

Medalists

Results

Heats

Semifinals

Final

References

Athletics at the 1979 Summer Universiade
1979